Harpalus gisellae is a species of ground beetle in the subfamily Harpalinae. It was described by Csiki in 1932.

References

gisellae
Beetles described in 1932